is a Japanese publishing company known for publishing dictionaries and textbooks.

Notable publications

Dictionary
 Daijirin : Japanese dictionary
 Sanseido Kokugo Jiten : Japanese dictionary
 Shin Meikai kokugo jiten : Japanese dictionary

External links
Official site

Book publishing companies in Tokyo
Publishing companies established in 1915
1915 establishments in Japan